The 1952 Ulster Grand Prix was the sixth round of the 1952 Grand Prix motorcycle racing season. It took place on 14–16 August 1952 at the Clady Circuit.

500 cc classification

350 cc classification

250 cc classification

125 cc classification

References

Ulster Grand Prix
Ulster
Ulster
Ulster Grand Prix
Ulster Grand Prix